is the 22nd single by Japanese idol Momoe Yamaguchi. Written by Yoko Aki and Ryudo Uzaki, the single was released on May 1, 1978, by CBS Sony.

Background 
The title "Playback" was suggested by Yamaguchi's management, who requested Aki and Uzaki to compose the song and Kōji Makaino to arrange it. When the first version was rejected, Aki and Uzaki worked overnight to revise the song and gave the new version to arranger Mitsuo Hagita; hence the song being titled "Playback Part 2". The original version with Makaino's arrangement was released as "Playback Part 1" in the compilation album The Best Playback.

"Playback" in the lyrics refers to a keyword of a current event that triggers a memory from the previous night. The first verse mentions the keyword, followed by the line, . Then the song stops, implying a rewind before proceeding to the second verse. The temporary silence in the middle of the song initially led to confusion from radio DJs who thought the song ended quickly.

When Yamaguchi first performed the song live on NHK, the line  was replaced with  due to broadcasting laws prohibiting the promotion of brands in song lyrics. By the time she performed the song on the 29th Kōhaku Uta Gassen that year, the "crimson Porsche" line was restored in the lyrics.

"Playback Part 2" earned Yamaguchi the Gold Award at the 20th Japan Record Awards and the Broadcast Music Award at the 9th Japan Music Awards.

Commercial performance 
The single peaked at No. 2 on Oricon's singles chart and landed at No. 15 on Oricon's 1978 year-ending chart, selling over 508,000 copies.

Track listing 
All lyrics are written by Yoko Aki; all music is composed by Ryudo Uzaki; all music is arranged by Mitsuo Hagita.

Charts

Weekly charts

Year-end charts

Cover versions 
 Yūko Nitō covered the song in her 1990 cover album Easter.
 The Nolans covered the song in English in their 1991 Momoe Yamaguchi cover album, also titled Playback Part 2. They re-recorded the song in their 2005 cover album The Nolans Sing Momoe 2005 to commemorate  Yamaguchi's 25th retirement anniversary.
 Midori Karashima covered the song in the 2004 album Momoe Yamaguchi Tribute: Thank You For...
 Misono covered the song in her 2009 Cover Album.
 Megumi Mori covered the song in her 2013 cover album Grace of the Guitar.
 Penicillin covered the song in their 2014 single "Sol".
 Ai Nishida covered the song in her 2015 cover album Ai no Uta ~Love Songs~.
 Pushim covered the song in their 2016 cover album The Nostalgics.
 Yamaguchi's son Yutaro Miura covered the song in his 2017 cover album I'm Home.
 Keisuke Kuwata covered the song in his 2019 live video Act Against AIDS 2018: Heisei 30! Daisankai Hitori Benishiro Uta Gassen.

References

External links 
 
 

1978 singles
1978 songs
Japanese-language songs
Songs with lyrics by Yoko Aki
Songs with music by Ryudo Uzaki
Sony Music Entertainment Japan singles